This is a list of Dalai Lamas of Tibet. There have been 14 recognised incarnations of the Dalai Lama. 

There has also been one non-recognised Dalai Lama, Ngawang Yeshe Gyatso (declared in 1707), by Lha-bzang Khan as the "true" 6th Dalai Lama – however, he was never accepted as such by the majority of the population.

List
{| class="wikitable" style="text-align:center"
! Title
! Portrait
! Name
! TibetanWylie transliteration
! Dalai Lama from
! Dalai Lama until
|-
| 1st Dalai Lama
| 
| Gedun Drupa
| dge 'dun grub pa
| N/A
| 1474
|-
| 2nd Dalai Lama
| 
| Gedun Gyatso
| dge-'dun rgya-mtsho
| 1492
| 1542
|-
| 3rd Dalai Lama
| 
| Sonam Gyatso
| bsod nams rgya mtsho
| 1578
| 1588
|-
| 4th Dalai Lama
| 
| Yonten Gyatso
| yon tan rgya mtsho
| 1601
| 1617
|-
| 5th Dalai Lama
| 
| Ngawang Lobsang Gyatso
| Ngag-dbang blo-bzang rgya-mtsho
| 1642
| 1682
|-
| 6th Dalai Lama
| 
| Tsangyang Gyatso
| tshangs-dbyangs rgya-mtsho
| 1697
| 1706
|-
| 7th Dalai Lama
| 
| Kelzang Gyatso
| bskal bzang rgya mtsho
| 1720
| 1757
|-
| 8th Dalai Lama
| 
| Jamphel Gyatso
| jam dpal rgya mtsho| 1762
| 1804
|-
| 9th Dalai Lama
| 
| Lungtok Gyatso
| lung rtogs rgya mtsho| 1810
| 6 March 1815
|-
| 10th Dalai Lama
| 
| Tsultrim Gyatso
| tshul khrim rgya mtsho| 1826
| 30 September 1837
|-
| 11th Dalai Lama
| 
| Khedrup Gyatso
| mkhas grub rgya mtsho| 1842
| 31 January 1856
|-
| 12th Dalai Lama
| 
| Trinley Gyatso
| '''phrin las rgya mtsho
| 1860
| 25 April 1875
|-
| 13th Dalai Lama| 
| Thubten Gyatso
| thub bstan rgya mtsho
| 31 July 1879
| 17 December 1933
|-
| rowspan="2"|14th Dalai Lama'| rowspan="2"|
| rowspan="2"|Tenzin Gyatso
| rowspan="2"|bstan 'dzin rgya mtsho| 22 February 1940
| rowspan="2"|Incumbent
|-
| 17 November 1950
|}

See also
 List of Panchen Lamas
 List of rulers of Tibet

References

Bibliography

 
 Mullin, Glenn H. (2001). The Fourteen Dalai Lamas: A Sacred Legacy of Reincarnation''. Clear Light Publishers. Santa Fe, NM. .

History of Tibet
Dalai Lamas
Tibet